JDS Akebono (DE-201) was a destroyer escort (or frigate) of the Japanese Maritime Self-Defense Force. Akebono was one of the first indigenous Japanese warships to be built following World War II. Akebono was laid down in 1954 as a steam turbine powered "B type" ASW escort, the only ship of its class, for comparison with two similar diesel powered ships, the s. Akebono entered service in 1956 and remained in use until 1976.

Design and construction
The Japanese Marine Safety Force (later to become the Japanese Maritime Self-Defense Force) authorised the purchase of three "B type" escort vessels as part of the Financial Year 1953 programme. Of the three ships, two of which were to be powered by diesel engines (the Ikazuchi class) and the third by steam turbines, to be called Akebono.

The equipment of the three escorts was similar, with two American  guns, four 40 mm Bofors guns, a Hedgehog anti-submarine projector and eight K-gun depth charge launchers.

Akebono was laid down at the Ishikawajima Tokyo shipyard on 10 December 1954. She was launched on 15 October 1955 and completed on 20 March 1956.

Operations
Akebono was re-armed in March 1958, when her original 3-inch guns were replaced by more modern, autoloading 3 inch guns, with 1 Bofors gun, four K-guns also removed. Akebono was discarded in 1976.

References

Blackman, Raymond V. B. Jane's Fighting Ships 1960–61. London: Sampson Low, Marston & Co., 1960.
Gardiner, Robert and Stephen Chumbley. Conway's All The World's Fighting Ships 1947–1995. Annapolis, Maryland, USA: Naval Institute Press, 1995. .

Frigate classes
1955 ships
Akebono
Ships built by IHI Corporation